Steven John Tiley (born 11 September 1982) is an English professional golfer.

Tiley was born in Canterbury. He was assisted by College Prospects of America and attended Georgia State University and turned professional in 2007. Having failed to reach the final stage of the European Tour qualifying school, he gained his card on the Asian Tour. He had three top 10 finishes during his first season, but finished just outside the top 65 on the Order of Merit that was required to retain his playing status.

Tiley began the 2009 season on the Jamega Tour, a UK-based developmental tour. After a strong start, winning three tournaments, he started to play in some events on the second tier Challenge Tour. Later in the year he won the Egyptian Open, a Challenge Tour specially approved tournament prior to it becoming a full tour event in 2010.

Since 2010 Tiley has played mainly on the Challenge Tour. He qualified for the European Tour in 2011 and 2017 but had little success and returned to the Challenge Tour. He did not win on the Challenge Tour until July 2019, when he won the Le Vaudreuil Golf Challenge, although he has been runner-up four times before that, in 2010, 2013, 2016 and 2018.

Professional wins (6)

Challenge Tour wins (1)

Jamega Pro Golf Tour wins (3)
2009 Jamega Tour at Mentmore, Jamega Tour at The Vale, Jamega Tour at The Vale of Glamorgan

Other wins (2)
2009 Egyptian Open
2018 Farmfoods British Par 3 Championship

Results in major championships

Note: Tiley only played in The Open Championship.

CUT = missed the half-way cut
"T" = tied

Team appearances
Amateur
European Amateur Team Championship (representing England): 2005 (winners)
Palmer Cup: 2005

See also
2010 European Tour Qualifying School graduates
2016 European Tour Qualifying School graduates

References

External links

English male golfers
European Tour golfers
Asian Tour golfers
Georgia State University alumni
Sportspeople from Canterbury
1980 births
Living people